Panyas Chandrashekhar Vijayji Maharaj Saheb (18 January 1934 – 8 August 2011), also known as Gurudev or Guruma, was a Jain monk, scholar and author. Born and educated in Mumbai, he was initiated as a monk who was later designated Panyas. He was involved in religious as well as sociopolitical activities. He founded several institutions and authored 261 books.

Biography
He was born on 18 January 1934 (Vikram Samvat 1990, Falgun Sud 5)  in Bombay to Subhadraben and Kantilal Jivatlal Pratapshi. His family belonged to Radhanpur in present-day  Banaskantha district. His birth name was Indravadan. He studied till matriculation. He was initiated as a Jain monk by Prem Suri on 15 May 1952 (Vikram Samvat 2008, Vaisakh Vad 6) at Motisha Jain auditorium, Byculla, Mumbai and was given new name,  Chandrashekhar Vijay. Later he was elevated to designation of Panyas on 2 December 1984 (Vikram Samvat 2041, Magshar Sud 10) at Navsari, Gujarat.

He led a nationwide campaign in 2002–2003 against the plan of opening 56,000 new abattoirs by the Government of India. He initiated 87 disciples as Jain monks. He authored more than 287 books on various subjects including religion, culture, nationalism, history, education, criticism and short stories. He established several religious and socio-cultural organizations such as Akhil Bharatiya Sanskruti Rakshak Dal and Vardhaman Sanskardham. He founded two schools which profess Indian cultural education, Tapovan Sanskardham at Navsari and Tapovan Sanskarpith near Ahmedabad. He was also considered one of the best orators among Jain monks.

He died on 8 August 2011 (Vikram Samvat 2067, Shravan Sud 10) at Ambavadi, Ahmedabad. He was cremated at Tapovan Sanskarpith, Amiyapur, Gandhinagar where his memorial temple was constructed later.

Works
He has written 261 books. Sadhnani Pagdandie was his first book. To Bharatno Uday Chapatima was his last. He was inspired to start Muktidoot, Virtidoot and Tapal Dwara Tatvagyan magazines. Nyaay Sidhaant Muktavali, Avacchedkatva Niryukti and Samanya Niryukti are his books on Nyaya philosophy.

References 

Scholars of Jainism
2011 deaths
1934 births
Writers from Mumbai
Gujarati-language writers
Indian Jain monks 
20th-century Indian Jain writers 
20th-century Jain monks 
20th-century Indian monks
21st-century Indian Jains 
21st-century Jain monks 
21st-century Indian monks
Śvētāmbara monks